Longlea is  a locality in the City of Greater Bendigo in central Victoria, Australia  east of the Bendigo central business district and approximately  North-West (by road) from the Victorian Capital of Melbourne.

Longlea is a rural locality of Bendigo and is composed almost entirely of family homes on 'acreage' or small farms.

References

External links

Bendigo
Towns in Victoria (Australia)